Jingtou may refer to:

 Jingtou, Fogang County (迳头镇), town in Guangdong, China
 Jingtou, Hengyang (井头镇), a town of Hengyang County, Hunan.